Großkarolinenfeld station is a railway station in the municipality of Großkarolinenfeld, located in the Rosenheim district of Bavaria, Germany. It has two tracks, which are located next to two side platforms, which are connected by an underpass.

References

Railway stations in Bavaria
Buildings and structures in Rosenheim (district)
Railway stations in Germany opened in 1871
1871 establishments in Bavaria